Philometra is a genus of nematodes, which are parasites of marine and freshwater fishes. The genus was erected by Oronzio Gabriele Costa in 1845.

Species in this genus are worldwide. They parasitize the body cavities, tissues and ovaries of both marine and freshwater fishes. When still in the larval stages, these worms move to the body cavities or subcutaneous tissues in the host. This migration can cause damage to skeletal joints, result in internal bleeding, and inflame visceral organs. Emaciation and lowered growth rates may result from this.

Infestation produces nodules under the skin. When the worms are in the adult or juvenile stage, these nodules may be visible between the rays of the fins or may cause the scales to raise up. Larger nodules may be the result of gravid females which may rupture the skin surface. Once ruptured, the female disintegrates. This allows the release of the live larvae into the water. This wound on the fish then heals, leaving almost no scarring.

Species of Philometra require two hosts to complete their life cycle. After the larval worms are released from the host fish, they are ingested by copepods which act as an intermediate host. Once inside the copepod, the larvae molt several times. Fish may then eat the infested copepod.

Known hosts
Species of this genus are known to parasitize numerous species of fish, including:
Blacktip grouper
Herring scad
Bigeye scad
Bluefish

Gallery

Taxonomy
The following species are recognized by the World Register of Marine Species:

 Philometra gerrei Moravec & Manoharan, 2013
 Philometra globiceps (Rudolphi, 1819)
 Philometra lagocephali Moravec & Justine, 2008
 Philometra onchorhynchi Kuitinen-Ekbaum, 1933
 Philometra otolithi Moravec & Manoharan, 2013
 Philometra ovata (Zeder, 1803)
 Philometra priacanthi Moravec & Justine, 2009
 Philometra rischta Skrjabin, 1917
 Philometra rubra (Leidy, 1856)
 Philometra saltatrix Ramachandran, 1973
 Philometra sanguinea (Rudolphi, 1819)
 Philometra scombresoxis Nikolaeva & Naidenova, 1964
 Philometra sphyraenae Moravec & Manoharan, 2013
 Philometra tauridica Ivashkin, Naidenova, Kovaleva & Khromova, 1971
 Philometra translucida Walton, 1927

Nomina dubia
 Philometra brevicollis Moravec & Justine, 2011
 Philometra carolinensis Moravec , de Buron & Roumillat, 2006
 Philometra cephalus Ramachandran, 1975
 Philometra charlestonensis Moravec , de Buron, Baker & González-Solís, 2008
 Philometra cyanopodi Moravec & Justine, 2008
 Philometra cynoscionis Moravec , de Buron & Roumillat, 2006
 Philometra fasciati Moravec & Justine, 2008
 Philometra filiformis (Stossich, 1896)
 Philometra floridensis Moravec , Fajer-Avila & Bakenhaster, 2010
 Philometra genypteri Moravec , Chávez & Olivia, 2011
 Philometra gymnothoracis Moravec & Buron, 2009
 Philometra inimici Yamaguti, 1941
 Philometra isaki Quiazon, Yoshinaga & Ogawa, 2008
 Philometra jordanoi (López-Neyra, 1951)
 Philometra justinei Moravec , Ternengo & Levron, 2006
 Philometra katsuwoni Petter & Baudin-Laurencin, 1986
 Philometra lateolabracis (Yamaguti, 1935)
 Philometra lethrini Moravec & Justine, 2008
 Philometra macroandri (Shchepkina, 1978)
 Philometra madai Quiazon, Yoshinaga & Ogawa, 2008
 Philometra managatuwo Yamaguti, 1941
 Philometra margolisi Moravec , et al., 1995
 Philometra mexicana Moravec & Salgado-Maldonado, 2007
 Philometra mira Moravec & Justine, 2011
 Philometra nemipteri Luo, 2001
 Philometra neolateolabracis Rajyalakshmi, Hanumantha Rao & Shyamasundari, 1985
 Philometra neptomeni Mateo, 1972
 Philometra obladae Moravec , Gaglio, Panebianco & Giannetto, 2008
 Philometra obturans (Prennant, 1886)
 Philometra ocularis Moravec , Ogawa, Suzuki, Miyazaki & Donai, 2002
 Philometra overstreeti Moravec & de Buron, 2006
 Philometra pellucida (Jägerskiöld, 1893)
 Philometra rajani Mukherjee, 1963
 Philometra sciaenae Yamaguti, 1941
 Philometra scomberomori (Yamaguti, 1935)
 Philometra sebastisci Yamaguti, 1941
 Philometra serranellicabrillae Janiszewska, 1949
 Philometra strongylurae Moravec & Ali, 2005
 Philometra tenuicauda Moravec & Justine, 2009
 Philometra terapontis Moravec , Gopalakrishnan, Rajkumar, Saravanakumar & Kaliyamoorthy, 2011
 Philometra tylosuri Moravec & Ali, 2005

References

Further reading
 

 

 

Secernentea genera
Camallanida
Parasitic nematodes of fish
Taxa named by Oronzio Gabriele Costa